Salonta (colloquially , ;) is a city in Bihor County, in the geographical region of Crișana, north-western Romania, near the Hungarian border.

Population

According to the Romanian census from 2011, the city has a population of 17,042, made up of Hungarians (58.1%), Romanians (38.83%), Romani (2.4%), Slovaks 0.4% and others (0.5%).
In terms of religion, in year 2002, 51.12% were Reformed (Calvinist), 36.46% Romanian Orthodox, 6.56% Roman Catholic and 5.86% was split between Baptists, Romanian Greek-Catholic, Pentecostals and other faiths.

History
The city, a part of the Kingdom of Hungary, was first documented in 1214 under the name of Zolonta and in 1332 a Papal document used the name Zalanta. The Hungarian spelling Szalonta was used since 1587.

Etymologically, the name is probably related with those of other Romanian localities (slavic names) like Slatina, Zlatna or Slănic, whose Romanian meaning is "Sărata" ("Saline"). It can also be derived from Hungarian "szalona" ("bacon"), a term having the same etymological meaning, and in regional context – the name of two contiguous villages are probably related with the types of stock growth in the area: Mădăras, from Hungarian "madar" ("bird"), and Tulca from Hungarian "tulok" ("bullock") – it may refer to the numerous pig growers in its perimeter.

Until the 16th century, it was only a small village of about 300 inhabitants and was on the land of the Toldi family. A bigger city was the fort of Culiser, which was however destroyed by the Turks in 1598.

Culiser was never rebuilt and Salonta began to have a more important role in the region after 1606, when the prince of Transylvania, Stephan Bocskai settled 300 soldiers here and appropriated land for them. They built their own farms, but had to keep their arms ready to repel an attack by the Turks. 3 June, the day in which the soldiers were settled, is nowadays declared "the day of the city". However, Ottoman Turks captured the town in 1660 and as "Salanta", it became the sanjak center of Varat vilayet until 1692.

The 19th century Hungarian poet János Arany was born and lived in Salonta for most of his life. Lajos Zilahy, another noted Hungarian author, was also born in Salonta on 27 March 1891.

Salonta, along with all of Transylvania, became part of Romania with the 1920 Treaty of Trianon. From 1940 to 1944, as a result of the Second Vienna Award, it formed part of Hungary; after the Second World War, the Paris Peace Treaties reaffirmed the Trianon border.

Climate and geography
Salonta has a continental humid climate, with warm to hot summers and cold to very cold winters, but relatively little snow. The average annual precipitation is 578 cubic mm (35.2 inches).

Economy
Salonta is famous nationwide for its Salam de Salonta sausage products that have been produced since the 1970s. Most of the state-owned factories built during the communist period went into bankruptcy since 1989. During the 2000s however, there has been a considerable foreign direct investment in small factories and assembly plants – particularly in the clothing industry.

In 2008, Inteva Products LLC – a large multinational – started production at its Salonta facility, the only one the company has in Romania and one in only five throughout Central and Eastern Europe. Inteva produces cables and latches and other car parts at the Salonta facility.

Trivia
The city of Salonta hosted the 2006 Romanian National Gliders Championship (Campionat naţional de aeromodelism) and its team, Metalul Salonta, has won the championship several times.

Politics

The Salonta Municipal Council, elected in the 2012 local government elections, is made up of 17 councillors, with the following party composition:

Sports 
Basketball: C.S.S. "TEODOR NES" SALONTA

Tengo Salonta is Salonta's football tennis team, a very successful club at national level and also the current Football Tennis Club World Cup champions, title won in 2017 after a 3–1 in the final against Czech club from Karlovy Vary, the host of the tournament.

Football is also a sport with a long tradition in the town situated near the Hungarian border. Olimpia Salonta is the team of Salonta, being founded in 1911, the club played mostly at Liga III and Liga IV, with 31 seasons played in the third league of the Romanian football league system.

For 10 years, between 2003 and 2013, in Salonta existed another football club, Liberty Salonta, a club with a strong academy at national level that promoted many interesting players over time, even managing a promotion to Liga I in 2006, but the club sold its place to UTA Arad and never played at the highest level of the Romanian football.

International relations

Twin towns – sister cities
Salonta is twinned with:
 Csepel, Hungary
 Hajdúböszörmény, Hungary
 Nagykőrös, Hungary
 Rimavská Sobota, Slovakia
 Sarkad, Hungary (since 2001)
 Túrkeve, Hungary (since 1994)
 Derecske, Hungary
 Békéscsaba, Hungary

Image gallery

References

 NASA Langley Research Center Atmospheric Science Data Center; New et al. 2002, online, http://www.gaisma.com/en/location/salonta.html
 Romanian National Aeromodelism, Salonta Cup,

External links

 Salonta General Information Site

 
Populated places in Bihor County
Localities in Crișana
Cities in Romania
Hungary–Romania border crossings